Carlo Bon Compagni, Count of Mombello (Turin, 25 July 1804 – Turin, 14 December 1880) was an Italian judge, educator and politician.

Bon Compagni served in early constitutional governments of the Kingdom of Sardinia. He was Minister of Public Education in the Balbo and Casati cabinets, and Minister of Grace and Justice in the second D'Azeglio cabinet and the first Cavour cabinet. A three-time President of the Chamber of Deputies, he became a senator in the unified Kingdom of Italy on 15 November 1874.

1804 births
1880 deaths
Politicians from Turin
Historical Right politicians
Members of the Chamber of Deputies (Kingdom of Sardinia)
Presidents of the Chamber of Deputies (Italy)
Deputies of Legislature VIII of the Kingdom of Italy
Deputies of Legislature IX of the Kingdom of Italy
Deputies of Legislature X of the Kingdom of Italy
Deputies of Legislature XI of the Kingdom of Italy
Members of the Senate of the Kingdom of Italy
Recipients of the Order of Saints Maurice and Lazarus
19th-century Italian jurists